Landström may refer to:

Björn Landström (1917–2002), Finnish artist and author
Eeles Landström (born 1932), Finnish pole vaulter 
Eivor Landström (1919–2004), Swedish actress 
Elin Landström (born 1992), Swedish association footballer 
Jessica Landström (born 1984), Finnish sportsperson